The Panamanian Social Security Fund (CSS) or Caja de Seguro Social Panameña (as it is known in Spanish) is a public institution of the Republic of Panama that is in charge of the planning, control and administration of the contingencies of the social security of Panama. The Social Security Fund was founded on March 21, 1941, by means of Law No. 23. The main headquarters of the Social Security Fund is in the capital of Panama, Panama City. This public institution is the one most frequently visited by Panamanian citizens regarding the issue of social security. In the National Health System of Panama, the Social Security Fund insures 80% of the population, of health services and economic benefits, 20% of the so-called uninsured population, is attended at their cost in the National System of health by the Ministry of Health.

Function 
The Panamanian Social Security Fund is in charge of administering and governing the social security system of the Republic of Panama. The social security fund is responsible for coordinating pensions, plans such as survival, disability and old age. The social security fund also offers benefits to the civilian population, such as: maternity benefits and sickness benefits, all these benefits are administered by the social security fund of the republic of Panama.

Headquarters 
The headquarters of the Social Security Fund is located in the capital of Panama, Panama City, in the district of Ancón, Clayton, on Calle Demetrio Basilio Lakas. Currently where the headquarters of the Social Security Fund is located, part of the Panama Canal Zone was located, which was an unincorporated territory of the United States.

General management 
The positions of the directors and executive directors, together with their respective officials, of the Social Security Fund Board of Directors:
 Director general: Enrique Lau Córtes
 Deputy director general: Francisco Bustamante Peña
 General secretary: Daniel Delgado Diamante
 Executive director of Health Services and Benefits: Felix Camargo Ardines

Executive Director of Human Resources 
 Roberto Crespo Lezcana

Executive Director of Finance and Administration 
 José Croston

Executive Director of Economic Benefits 
 Dídimos Barrios

Executive Director of Legal 
 Benicio Robinson

Executive Director of Insured Services 
 Alfredo Petterson

Executive Director of Innovation and Transformation 
 Carlos Rodriguez

Executive Director of Communications 
 Mara Rivera

Executive Director of Infrastructure and Support Services 
 Carlos Rodriguez

References

External links
  

Healthcare in Panama